Democratic Montenegro (Serbian and Montenegrin: Демократска Црна Гора / Demokratska Crna Gora), also known as the Democrats (Демократе / Demokrate), is a conservative liberal, centrist, populist and pro-European political party in Montenegro. Democrats currently has nine MPs in the Parliament of Montenegro, elected in 2020, from the big tent Peace is Our Nation (MNN) electoral list. Its founder and current leader is Aleksa Bečić, former President of the Parliament. It is also the second largest political party in the parliament.

History
The Democratic Montenegro was formed in 2015 when the faction of Socialist People's Party split and formed a new political party, represented by 2 MPs in the Parliament of Montenegro.

The Democrats increased their number of MPs from 2 to 8 in the October 2016 parliamentary election and after the local elections held the same year, the party gained mayoral positions in Budva and Kotor municipalities. At the local elections held in Herceg Novi in May 2017 the party won 9 out of 34 seats, leading the opposition coalition which formed the local government. Since the constitution the new parliament the entire opposition (all 39 MPs out of 81 in total) started a collective boycott of all parliamentary sittings, due to claims of electoral fraud at the 2016 parliamentary elections, Democratic Montenegro MPs remained in a boycott with the same demands until the end of the term.

In March 2018, Democrats decides to support the candidacy of independent candidate Mladen Bojanić to run for president of Montenegro at April 2018 presidential election, as did Democratic Front (DF), Socialist People's Party (SNP), United Reform Action (URA) and United Montenegro (UCG). At the election, Bojanić came second, behind Milo Đukanović, with 33.40% of the vote. In the 2018 local elections, Democrats formed an electoral coalition with the United Reform Action in a number of municipalities. After elections Democrats become part of the local government only in Berane, forming an post-election coalition with DF and SNP, remaining opposition in the rest of the municipalities.

In July 2020, Democratic Montenegro decided to enter the big tent Peace is Our Nation (Mir je naša nacija) coalition with Demos, New Left and PUPI, as well some independent candidates, such as liberal politician Vladimir Pavićević, former leader of the Montenegrin, in order to participate at the forthcoming August 2020 parliamentary election. On 23 September, 41 deputies of the three lists of the new majority in parliament (Peace is Our Nation, For the Future of Montenegro and the United Reform Action) elected Democrats leader Bečić as the new President of the Parliament of Montenegro, 4 deputies from minority parties (3 from the Bosniak Party and 1 from Albanian Alternative) also voted for his election.

Electoral performance

Parliamentary elections

Presidential elections

 Independent candidate, support

Positions held
Major positions held by the Democratic Montenegro members:

References

2015 establishments in Montenegro
Political parties established in 2015
Political parties in Montenegro
Centrist parties in Europe
Conservative liberal parties
Populist parties
Pro-European political parties in Montenegro
Montenegro–European Union relations